Dorymyrmex minutus is a species of ant in the genus Dorymyrmex. Described by Emery in 1895, the species is endemic to Argentina and Chile

References

Dorymyrmex
Hymenoptera of South America
Insects described in 1895